Uch Tappeh (also Romanized as Ūch Tappeh) is a village in Tork-e Sharqi Rural District, Jowkar District, Malayer County, Hamadan Province, Iran. At the 2006 census, its population was 1,380, in 281 families.

References 

Populated places in Malayer County